Ricardo Barreiro (October 2, 1949 – April 12, 1999) was an Argentine comic book writer.

Biography

Barreiro was born in the barrio of Palermo in Buenos Aires. At a very early age he published articles and short stories on the underground magazine Sancho. His first comic book as writer was SlotBar, with art by Francisco Solano Lopez. This was followed by the noteworthy war series of As de Pique ("Pik As") and the science-fiction The City, both drawn by Juan Giménez.

In the 1970s he moved to Europe, living in Paris and Rome for six years; he became particularly popular in France.

Barreiro returned to Argentina, where he died of larynx cancer at age 49.

Many of his titles appeared in Spanish, Italian and Dutch. Not much has been translated in English.

Bibliography

Comics work includes:
Cain, with Risso, Ediciones de la Urraca
Ciudad, with Juan Giménez) Hora Cero
El Instituto, with Francisco Solano López)
El Instituto II, with Francisco Solano López) Doedytores
Factor Límite , with Juan Giménez, Colección Vilan
Moving Fortress, with Enrique Alcatena, Skorpio
PARQUE CHAS I and II, with Risso
Slot Barr, with Francisco Solano López, Editorial Colihue
Bárbara, with Juan Zanotto
Virus, with Ariel Olivetti, Mauro Cascioli, Julian Aznar, Marcelo Sosa and Juan Bobillo, Comic Press
As de Pique, with Juan Gimenez
El Mago, with Enrique Alcatena
El Eternauta: Odio Cósmico Nº1
El Eternauta: Odio Cósmico Nº2
Buenos Aires, las putas y el loco, with Oswal
Le Pecheur de Brooklyn, with Massimo Rotundo

Notes

References

External links
 
Ricardo Barreiro biography at Historieta Parque Chas 

Argentine comics writers
Argentine male writers
Deaths from cancer in Argentina
Deaths from esophageal cancer
1949 births
1999 deaths
Writers from Buenos Aires